Karina Ibragimovna Sabirova (born 23 March 1998) is a Russian-Kazakh handballer for CSKA Moscow and the Russian national team.

Achievements
Russian Super League:
Winner: 2016

Individual awards 
 All-Star Left Back of the European U-17 Championship: 2015
 MVP of the IHF Youth World Championship: 2016

References

External links

1998 births
Living people
Sportspeople from Astrakhan
Russian female handball players
Handball players at the 2014 Summer Youth Olympics